Andrews Nakahara (born March 12, 1983) is a Brazilian professional mixed martial artist, kickboxer and kyokushin karateka currently signed with K-1. He made his MMA pro debut against Kazushi Sakuraba at the Dream 2: Middleweight Grand Prix 2008 First Round. Andrews and Francisco Filho were awarded in 2008 a Brazilian Jiu-Jitsu Blue Belt under former Strikeforce contender Marcos Barbosa.

Biography
Nakahara was born in Mogi das Cruzes, Brazil on March 12, 1983, to Japanese parents who arrived in Brazil during the Japanese immigration boom in the early 60s and 70s. Even though his parents are Japanese, Nakahara cannot speak Japanese and was raised only speaking Portuguese. Nakahara first begun to study Kyokushin kaikan a strong full contact karate style developed by Masutatsu Oyama. Nakahara went on to join the International Karate Organization (IKO) team. Since then he has been successful in many competitions both in Brazil and America including championship fights with rival karatekas Ewerton Teixeira and Eduardo Tanaka.

The Ultimate Fighter: American Top Team vs. Blackzilians

Nakahara was confirmed as a cast member for The Ultimate Fighter 21 representing  Blackzilians

Titles and accomplishments
Kyokushin
2007  All American Open Karate Championships IKO-1 (Lost to Ewerton Teixeira)
2006  All American Open Karate Championships IKO-1 (Defeated Ewerton Teixeira)
2005  All American Open Karate Championships IKO-1 (Lost to Eduardo Tanaka)
2005  3rd Kyokushin World Weight Tournament
2005  South American Open IKO-1
2004 All American Open Karate Championships IKO-1 7th Place
2004  6th South American Karate Tournament (Middleweight)
2004  Brazilian Open IKO-1

Mixed martial arts record

|-
| Loss
| align=center| 5–4–2
| Emmanuel Walo
| Decision (split)
|WSOF 35
| 
| align=center| 3
| align=center| 5:00
|Verona, New York, United States
| 
|-
| Win
| align=center| 5–3–2
| Travis Doerge
| TKO (punches)
|WSOF 32
| 
| align=center| 1
| align=center| 0:55
|Everett, Washington, United States
| 
|-
| Loss
| align=center| 4–3–2
| Maki Pitolo
| TKO (punches)
| VFC 49
| 
| align=center| 2
| align=center| 2:21
| Omaha, Nebraska, United States
| 
|-
| Draw
| align=center| 4–2–2
| Jung Hwan Cha
| Draw
| Road FC 13
| 
| align=center| 3
| align=center| 5:00
| Gumi, South Korea
| 
|-
| Draw
| align=center| 4–2–1
| Myung Ho Bae
| Draw
| Road FC 12
| 
| align=center| 3
| align=center| 5:00
| Wonju, South Korea
| 
|-
| Win
| align=center| 4–2
| Bruno Santa Barbara
| TKO (punches)
| Ichigeki 1
| 
| align=center| 1
| align=center| 2:03
| Mogi das Cruzes, Brazil
| 
|-
| Win
| align=center| 3–2
| Jun Hee Moon
| Decision (unanimous)
| K-1 World MAX 2010 –70 kg World Championship Tournament Final 16 in Seoul
| 
| align=center| 2
| align=center| 5:00
| Seoul, South Korea
| 
|-
| Loss
| align=center| 2–2
| Ryo Chonan
| Decision (unanimous)
| DREAM.13
| 
| align=center| 2
| align=center| 5:00
| Yokohama, Japan
| 
|-
| Win
| align=center| 2–1
| Shungo Oyama
| TKO (punches)
| DREAM.8
| 
| align=center| 1
| align=center| 2:00
| Nagoya, Japan
| 
|-
| Win
| align=center| 1–1
| Dong Sik Yoon
| TKO (punches)
| Dream 6: Middleweight Grand Prix 2008 Final Round
| 
| align=center| 2
| align=center| 0:30
| Saitama, Japan
| 
|-
| Loss
| align=center| 0–1
| Kazushi Sakuraba
| Submission (neck crank)
| Dream 2: Middleweight Grand Prix 2008 First Round
| 
| align=center| 1
| align=center| 8:20
| Saitama, Japan
|

References

External links

Official website  

1983 births
Living people
People from Mogi das Cruzes
Brazilian people of Japanese descent
Brazilian male mixed martial artists
Welterweight mixed martial artists
Middleweight mixed martial artists
Brazilian practitioners of Brazilian jiu-jitsu
People awarded a black belt in Brazilian jiu-jitsu
Brazilian male karateka
Brazilian expatriates in Japan
Mixed martial artists utilizing Kyokushin kaikan
Mixed martial artists utilizing Brazilian jiu-jitsu
Sportspeople from São Paulo (state)